The international and bilateral relations between Armenia and Pakistan are poor. Pakistan is the only country in the world that does not recognize Armenia as a state, although most Pakistani people are not aware of this fact. The primary cause of the two countries' diplomatic rift is the Nagorno-Karabakh conflict.

History

Nagorno-Karabakh conflict
Pakistan was the third country, after Turkey and Romania, to recognize Azerbaijan, and has close relations with it as it relates to conflicts in the Nagorno-Karabakh region. Pakistan had supported Azerbaijan during the First Nagorno-Karabakh War. In 2015, Pakistan declared that recognizing Armenia's independence is contingent on the latter leaving Karabakh. In 2020, Pakistan supported Azerbaijan in the 2020 Nagorno-Karabakh war and hailed the subsequent ceasefire, which brought Azerbaijan territorial gains.

Other aspects
At the end of 2016, Armenian–Pakistani relations further deteriorated, and Armenia vetoed Pakistan's bid for observer status in the Russian-led Collective Security Treaty Organization (CSTO) Parliamentary Assembly.

In 2019 after an interview with WION, Prime Minister Nikol Pashinyan has stated that Armenia supports India in the Kashmir conflict between India and Pakistan.

See also 

 Armenians in Pakistan
 Foreign relations of Armenia
 Foreign relations of Pakistan

References

Further reading
 "Pakistan and the World (Chronology: April–June 2005)", in: Pakistan Horizon, Vol. 58 (2005), No. 3, pp. 121–169. JSTOR.
 Shannon O'Lear & Robert Whiting: "Which comes first, the nation or the state? A multiple scale model applied to the Nagorno-Karabakh conflict in the Caucasus", in: National Identities, Vol. 10 (2008), No. 2, pp. 185–206. Taylor & Francis Online.

 
Pakistani
Bilateral relations of Pakistan